"Juicy Love" (stylized as "juicy LOVE") is the fourth Japanese single by South Korean girl group The Grace, released on July 12, 2006 by Rhythm Zone in both CD and CD+DVD (Limited Edition) versions. "Juicy Love" has been described as a hybrid reggae track, combining both a sweet lovers' rock melody and up-tempo dancehall beats and features Japanese reggae artist, Corn Head. The single also comes with "さよならの向こうに" ("Sayonara no Mukou ni", "On the Other Side of Goodbye) which features group member Dana on main vocals. Each single thus far has featured a b-side with a different member on lead vocals each time and now with Dana's "Sayonara no mukou ni", all four members have featured on a track.  It ranked #162 on the Oricon charts and charted for 1 week, selling 487 copies.

Track listing

CD Only
 "Juicy Love" feat. Corn Head
 "さよならの向こうに (Sayonara no mukou ni)" feat. Dana
 "Juicy Love" (Instrumental)
 "さよならの向こうに (Sayonara no mukou ni)" (Instrumental)

CD+DVD

CD Portion
 "Juicy Love" feat. Corn Head
 "さよならの向こうに (Sayonara no mukou ni)" feat. Dana
 "Juicy Love" (Instrumental)
 "さよならの向こうに (Sayonara no mukou ni)" (Instrumental)

DVD Portion
 "Juicy Love" Video clip
 Off shot & video clip making

External links
  Official Website

2006 singles
The Grace (band) songs